Claughton Hall (Claughton pronounced  ) is a large country house in the English village of Claughton, Lancashire. A Grade I listed building, it dates to around 1600, but it contains material believed to be from the 15th century.

The building was moved to its present site, from the bottom of the hill on which it sits, in 1932–33.  It is built in sandstone with stone-slate roofs.  At each end of the north front are tall projecting towers; the left tower is gabled, and the right tower has a hipped roof.  In the top storey of both towers are continuous mullioned and transomed windows.  The recessed section between them contains two chimneys on corbels, and a doorway flanked by three-light windows, and with an oriel window above.

It has been the home of former Blackpool F.C. owner Owen Oyston since the 1970s. Oyston was found guilty of raping a 16-year-old girl at the property in 1996.

See also

Listed buildings in Claughton, Lancaster

References

Sources

Country houses in Lancashire
Grade I listed buildings in Lancashire
Grade I listed houses
16th-century establishments in England